Asin (sometimes stylized as ASIN) is a Pinoy folk rock band from the Philippines. They started as a trio in the late 1970s before becoming a quartet, and was originally known as the Salt of the Earth. "Asin" means salt in Filipino language.

History

Formation and early success
ASIN was formed in late 1976, the nucleus of which was the duo of Mike Pillora Jr. of Negros Occidental and Cesar Bañares Jr. of South Cotabato, who were playing at folk joints and pub houses in Manila as 'Mike and Cesar'. A year later, Lolita Carbon was recruited by the duo to fill in the missing middle voice and eventually became the third member. Pillora named the trio 'Salt of the Earth' after the song recorded originally by The Rolling Stones and later by Joan Baez, written and composed by Mick Jagger and Keith Richards. Other than the song title, Pillora also based the name of the group from the Biblical metaphor salt of the earth which represents the humble and sincere masses.

In 1978, the trio (who were all songwriters, composers and arrangers) signed their first recording contract and localized their name 'Salt of the Earth' into 'Asin ng Lupa'. They ultimately became known simply as ASIN. The members also adopted handles (sobriquets) for themselves based on local style nicknames and they became known to their fans as Nonoy, Saro and Nene.

In the same year, their eponymous debut LP "Asin" was released, giving birth to an alternative form of music which was different and distinct from what was mainstream. Their songs conveyed a message that roused a social-awareness among the vast majority of Filipinos becoming a rallying call for social and political aspirations.

In the last quarter of 1979, they launched another album called Himig ng Pag-ibig ("Hymn of Love"). The group's break-up abruptly followed. However, their absence from the music scene did not hamper their growing popularity.

The group was not heard from until 1983. In the summer of the same year, AIESEC (Association Internationale des Etudiants en Sciences Economiques et Commerciales), a students’ business organization based in the island of Cebu, made a project to reunite the group. Nonoy was summoned and was tasked to reunite his band. This resulted in a jam-packed reunion concert of the group at Cebu Coliseum, Cebu City. From that time on, ASIN, with their manager Dindo, rolled into a series of performances in Mindanao, sporadic shows in the Visayan Region, and marathon concerts in Luzon.

This culminated in the creation and launch of their third album Himig ng Lahi ("Hymn of the Race") in the same year. Through Nonoy, Fred Aban Jr., the session bass player known by the name Pendong, was adopted by the trio and became the fourth member of the group although he had not been a songwriter ("Mga Limot na Bayani", "Siglo", "Pag-asa", among others were written by Pendong Aban Jr.). Since everybody in the group was a "junior" (each one was carrying their father's first name), Nene also proclaimed herself a "junior".

In early 1984, the group released an experimental album called Ang mga Awitin ng Bayan kong Pilipinas, an adaptation of traditional and contemporary songs from various regions of the Philippine archipelago.

In November 1985, they came out with another original compilation that Nonoy called ASIN...Sa Atubiling Panahon ("Asin...In A Doubtful Time"). This was unfolded by the roll of events that happened in the beginning of the following year, among which was the EDSA Revolution that toppled the ruling Marcos regime. ASIN called it "atubiling panahon" (doubtful time) and the group split for a second time.

In 1988, they decided to regroup again hoping to come up with new material to make another album that would speak of the time. Instead they were urged by their new manager into making an adaptation of outdated songs and came out with a double album called Himig Kayumanggi and Sinta.

Later on, various intrigues led to the expulsion of Nonoy. The disgruntled Nonoy went to Thailand, Sri Lanka, India, Greece, Israel and Egypt to "look for his soul". Back home, the dream of making a new album was not fulfilled. Soon after, Saro and Nene, together with the name (ASIN), joined the band known as Lokal Brown.

In 1990, the remaining members of Asin (who were under the leadership of a clique headed by their new manager) disbanded. Saro went back to his home province of South Cotabato, Nene formed 'Nene Band', and Pendong formed 'Grupong Pendong'.

In 1992, a concert promoter gathered the three original members, Nonoy, Saro and Nene for a reunion concert. Pendong, according to the promoter, was not included because of issues with scheduling. The concert was staged at the Folk Arts Theater. However, it was nothing more than a one night gig and each member went back again to their ways after the concert.

Death of Bañares
At around 9:00 p.m. on March 18, 1993, Cesar "Saro" Bañares was at a karaoke bar in his hometown of Koronadal when a brawl erupted among several customers. A single gunshot was fired which hit Bañares on the forehead. He was brought to the hospital but eventually died.

After a seven-year trial, lawyer Gualberto Cataluña Jr. and brothers Joelito and Joel Castracion were found guilty for the murder of Bañares and were sentenced to life imprisonment. They were also ordered to pay Bañares' family more than ₱1 million in damages. According to the prosecution's witnesses, Cataluña and the Castracion brothers assaulted Bañares over a misunderstanding. Cataluña allegedly started the fight by throwing a beer bottle at Bañares forehead. While the Castracion brothers were assaulting Bañares, Cataluña passed a handgun to Joelito Castracion who then shot Bañares. The three served their sentences at New Bilibid Prison. However, on June 1, 2007, Cataluña was released after a successful appeal that downgraded his conviction from murder to homicide. The court considered his sentence served after spending 7 years in detention and another 7 years incarcerated. Cataluña later resumed his law practice.

Later years
Between the late 1990s and early 2000s, Nene or Asin as she is known among her fans in Cagayan province up north, frequented her friend Willi Catral for some gigs. Her frequent visit to Tuguegarao has help her establish contacts with environment groups like the Sierra Madre Outdoor Club.

In 2000, Craig Burrows, MBE, originally from England but a long term resident of the Philippines, came up with the idea to bring together the remaining members of the group and make an album. He first spoke with Nonoy who eagerly agreed and later brought Nene and Pendong to Nonoy's island residence. The three had a few meetings wherein Nonoy came up with the concept for the album which the two eagerly accepted. However, the album was not released.

Nonoy's concept was never realized, but in 2002, with the support of Burrows, Nene and Pendong made the album Pag-ibig, Pagbabago, Pagpapatuloy. Later, Pendong shared his stories with the media, of how Nonoy had finally decided to put down his guitar and settle into a peaceful life; and of the band's beginnings, of how together with Nonoy and Saro, he met Nene at a folk rock club called Kola House and then decided to form their own musical group, naming it 'Salt of the Earth'. This he claimed was the beginning of the group ASIN.

Nonoy continued to perform with a new partner named Ginji, known together as 'Noyginji Interaktiv'. They distributed CDs with new compositions, such as "...Ang Karugtong" ("...The Continuation").

In mid-2006, Nene and Pendong parted ways. Pendong and his family emigrated to USA where he continued playing as Grupong Pendong. During the last quarter of the same year, Nonoy and his family moved to Israel and continued to perform as Noyginji Interaktiv. Nene stayed in the Philippines and played as a soloist.

On July 14, 2010, Nonoy and Nene reunited as ASIN to pay tribute to their fallen colleague Saro Bañares Jr. in Koronadal, South Cotabato. Their performance marked the opening of the 44th T’nalak Festival, a yearly celebration showcasing dances and crafts of the tribal communities as well as the produce of South Cotabato. The following day, they were invited by Manny Pacquiao to play in his home province Saranggani before a large crowd. On the third day, they casually played for invited guests of the mayor of Lake Sebu in Surallah, South Cotabato.

ASIN Won as MYX Magna Award in the recent 16th MYX Music Awards 2021 last August 6 via virtual online during the COVID 19 Pandemic and also contributing their excellence in OPM folk rock music industry.

Legacy of Asin
Asin was the first group to incorporate Filipino indigenous instruments into pop/rock music. They also studied Filipino tribal music and did what they could to be true to the origins of the music. Instead of plagiarizing the indigenous music, they set about educating people about respecting the origins of the music and representing it with agreement from the tribal sources.

Although Asin admittedly did not set out to be a political band, their songs most of which have themes of loneliness and longing, reflected the tumultuous undercurrent of the seventies in the Philippines under President Ferdinand Marcos. Sometimes their recordings were deemed subversive and confiscated, while other times they were considered patriotic and the band is occasionally invited to play at the Presidential Palace.

Members

Current
Mike "Nonoy" Pillora Jr. (1976–present)
Lolita "Nene" Carbon (1978–present)

Touring and session members
Henry "Douggy" Jamisola (1976-1978) - drummer
Benjamin "Ben" Abcede (1983-1987) - session drummer

Former members
Cesar "Saro" Bañares Jr. (1976–93; died in 1993)
Fred "Pendong" Aban Jr. (1983-1990; 2002-2006)

Note: There are only 4 official members of ASIN, all other backup players are session musicians.

References to Asin in popular culture

"Balita"
The Tagalog lyrics of The Black Eyed Peas' "The Apl Song" is based on "Balita" (Tagalog for News), one of Asin's songs. This song depicts the tragedies that are happening in the conflicts in Mindanao. The final chorus of the song is a mixture of Hiligaynon in the first two lines, and Cebuano in the last two lines, translated from the Tagalog chorus of the song. "The Apl Song" tells about the hardships of Allan Pineda, member of the Black Eyed Peas, that he experienced during his childhood in Angeles City. He chose "Balita" because he grew up listening to Asin. His next song from the album Monkey Business, entitled "Bebot", sampled the guitar riff of "Ang Bayan Kong Sinilangan (Cotabato)", another song by Asin. "Balita" is also sampled on the sixth track of Gloc-9's 2009 album Matrikula, which features Gabby Alipe of Urbandub.

"Masdan Mo ang Kapaligiran"
This song was in dedication to the Pasig River. It was used as the closing credits for the movie Engkanto starring Janice de Belen, Roderick Paulate, Vilma Santos and the late OPM hip hop King Kiko, the movie was released in 1993 by OctoArts Films.

"Himig Ng Pag-Ibig"
In 2010, Yeng Constantino covered the song as the theme for the ABS-CBN TV series Dyosa, arranged by Paolo Zarate. The original version was sampled by hiphop artist Pio featuring Lolita Carbon, released by Viva Records in 2012. The song was also covered by actress Glaiza de Castro for the Cinemalaya film Liway (2018). This has also been a cover soundtrack for the film "Adan" starring Cindy Miranda and Rhen Escaño.

The song's melody was referenced by British rock band Coldplay for their song Let Somebody Go, featuring American singer Selena Gomez.  It appears as the fifth track from the band's ninth studio album, Music of the Spheres. Several mash up of the two songs have been covered by independent artists on Youtube and TikTok.

The 2021 film Whether the Weather Is Fine used the song in a climactic sequence.

Discography

Albums
Asin (Vicor Music, 1978)
Himig ng Pag-ibig (Vicor Music, 1979)
Himig ng Lahi (Ivory Music, 1983)
Ang Mga Awitin ng Bayan Kong Pilipinas (Ivory Music, 1984)
Asin sa Atubiling Panahon (Ivory Music, 1986)
Himig Kayumanggi (Vicor Music, 1987)
Sinta (Vicor Music, 1988)
Pag-ibig, Pagbabago, Pagpapatuloy (Vicor Music, 2002)

Compilation albums
Mga Ginintuang Awitin ng Asin (Vicor Music, 1984)
Masdan Mo ang Kapaligiran (Vicor Music, 1994)
Ang Bayan Kong Sinilangan: Paglalakbay sa mga Awitin ng Asin (Vicor Music 40th Anniversary) (Vicor Music, 2005)
18 Greatest Hits (Vicor Music, 2009)

Singles
"Masdan Mo Ang Kapaligiran" (Vicor Music, 1978)
"Pagbabalik" (Vicor Music, 1978)
"Ang Bayan Kong Sinilangan" (Vicor Music, 1978)
"Itanong Mo Sa Mga Bata" (Vicor Music, 1979)
"Ang Buhay Ko" (Vicor Music, 1979)
"Himig ng Pag-ibig" (Vicor Music, 1979) (Re-recorded by original Asin lead singer Lolita Carbon Feat. hip hop artist Pio in 2012)
"Balita" (Vicor Music, 1979) (sampled by Black Eyed Peas as "The APL Song" in 2005)
"Gising Kaibigan" (Vicor Music, 1979)
"Usok" (Vicor Music, 1979)
"Lupa" (Vicor Music, 1984) (Original by the late Rico J. Puno)

Album appearances
Ugat: The Best Of OPM Folk Rock Vol. 1 (Vicor Music, 2008)
Ugat: The Best Of OPM Folk Rock Vol. 2 (Vicor Music, 2010)

Awards

Best Folksong of the Year for "Orasyon" – AWIT Awards 1984
Best Album of the Year for Himig ng Lahi – AWIT Awards 1984
Album of the Year for Himig ng Lahi – Jingle Magazine Awards 1984
Best Vocal Arrangement for Group in "Lupa" – Cecil Awards 1986
Department of Environment and Natural Resources Likas Yaman Award for Masdan Mo and Kapaligiran 1991
For Lolita Carbon – Best Rock Recording for "Paraisong Liku-liko", AWIT Awards 1990
For Pendong Aban, Jr. – Best World Music Album for Ang Grupong Pendong – Dito Sa Lupa
Album – Katha Music Awards 1995
Best Folksong for "Pagbabalik" – Aliw Awards 1979
Nominated as Best Rock Recording for "Usok" in the 1st Cecil Awards
Best Musical Arrangement for Dalawang Dekada ng Asin (Overture), AWIT Awards 2002
Environmental Champions 2004 - DENR/WORLD BANK Publication - Environmental Monitor 2004, given June 20, 2005
Winner, MYX Magna Award, MYX Music Awards 2021

See also
Juan de la Cruz Band
Mike Hanopol
Pinoy rock
Sampaguita

References

External links
 
 

Filipino rock music groups
Filipino folk music groups
Manila sound groups
Musical groups from Metro Manila
Musical groups established in 1976
Tagalog-language singers